Sportsklubben Vard Haugesund is a Norwegian football club located in Haugesund. The team currently plays in the 2. divisjon after being promoted from the 3. divisjon in 2019. The team reached the Norwegian Football Cup finals in 1962 and 1975. Vard played in the Norwegian top flight in 1976.

Recent history
{|class="wikitable"
|-bgcolor="#efefef"
! Season
! 
! Pos.
! Pl.
! W
! D
! L
! GS
! GA
! P
!Cup
!Notes
|-
|2006
|2. divisjon
|align=right |3
|align=right|26||align=right|14||align=right|4||align=right|8
|align=right|62||align=right|39||align=right|56
|First round
|
|-
|2007
|2. divisjon
|align=right |4
|align=right|26||align=right|12||align=right|6||align=right|8
|align=right|49||align=right|48||align=right|42
|Second round
|
|-
|2008
|2. divisjon
|align=right |7
|align=right|26||align=right|10||align=right|4||align=right|12
|align=right|44||align=right|48||align=right|34
||First round
|
|-
|2009
|2. divisjon
|align=right |2
|align=right|26||align=right|17||align=right|5||align=right|4
|align=right|64||align=right|36||align=right|56
||First round
|
|-
|2010
|2. divisjon
|align=right |5
|align=right|26||align=right|13||align=right|4||align=right|9
|align=right|54||align=right|35||align=right|40
||Second round
|
|-
|2011 
|2. divisjon
|align=right |2
|align=right|26||align=right|13||align=right|5||align=right|8
|align=right|57||align=right|35||align=right|44
||First round
|
|-
|2012 
|2. divisjon
|align=right bgcolor=#DDFFDD| 1
|align=right|26||align=right|15||align=right|8||align=right|3
|align=right|60||align=right|26||align=right|53
||Second round
|Promoted
|-
|2013 
|1. divisjon
|align=right bgcolor="#FFCCCC"| 13
|align=right|30||align=right|9||align=right|7||align=right|14
|align=right|46||align=right|55||align=right|34
||Third round
|Relegated
|-
|2014 
|2. divisjon
|align=right |3
|align=right|26||align=right|12||align=right|5||align=right|9
|align=right|57||align=right|38||align=right|41
||Third round
|
|-
|2015 
|2. divisjon
|align=right |3
|align=right|26||align=right|14||align=right|9||align=right|3
|align=right|66||align=right|37||align=right|51
||Second round
|
|-
|2016 
|2. divisjon
|align=right |4
|align=right|26||align=right|11||align=right|7||align=right|8
|align=right|46||align=right|34||align=right|40
||Second round
|
|-
|2017 
|2. divisjon
|align=right |8
|align=right|26||align=right|12||align=right|3||align=right|11
|align=right|33||align=right|36||align=right|39
||Second round
|
|-
|2018 
|2. divisjon
|align=right bgcolor="#FFCCCC"| 14
|align=right|26||align=right|3||align=right|5||align=right|18
|align=right|31||align=right|56||align=right|14
||First round
|Relegated
|-
|2019 
|3. divisjon
|align=right bgcolor=#DDFFDD| 1
|align=right|26||align=right|20||align=right|3||align=right|3
|align=right|103||align=right|22||align=right|63
||Second round
|Promoted
|-
|2020
|2. divisjon
|align=right |4
|align=right|19||align=right|11||align=right|1||align=right|7
|align=right|34||align=right|19||align=right|34
||Cancelled
|
|-
|2021
|2. divisjon
|align=right |5
|align=right|26||align=right|13||align=right|4||align=right|9
|align=right|39||align=right|32||align=right|43
||First round
|
|-
|2022
|2. divisjon
|align=right |10
|align=right|24||align=right|5||align=right|8||align=right|11
|align=right|32||align=right|43||align=right|23
||Second round
|
|}
Source:

Current squad

References

External links
 

 
Football clubs in Norway
Eliteserien clubs
Association football clubs established in 1916
Sport in Haugesund
1916 establishments in Norway